USS Algonquin may refer to the following ships operated by the United States Navy:

 
 , ex El Toro (1891) of Southern Pacific's Morgan Line, commissioned Algonquin on 2 April 1898, renamed Accomac 15 June 1898, YT-18 and YTL-18
 , Revenue Cutter Service gunboat ordered into Naval service for Spanish–American War serving 24 March 1898 – 17 August 1898 and again during World War I serving 6 April 1917 – 28 August 1919. Sold 23 September 1931 to Foss Launch and Tug Company, Tacoma, Washington.
 , United States Coast Guard patrol gunboat in commission from October 1934 to April 1947 and ordered into Naval service as part of the Greenland Patrol during World War II.

United States Navy ship names